The 1908 United States presidential election in Washington took place on November 3, 1908. All contemporary 46 states were part of the 1908 United States presidential election. Voters chose five electors to the Electoral College, which selected the president and vice president.

Washington had been established earlier in the 1900s as a one-party Republican bastion, which it would remain at a Presidential level apart from the 1910s GOP split until Franklin D. Roosevelt rose to power in 1932, and more or less continuously at state level during this era. Democratic representation in the Washington legislature would during this period at times be countable on one hand, and no Democrat other than Woodrow Wilson in 1916 would henceforth carry even one county in the state before Catholic Al Smith carried German-settled Ferry County in 1928. Republican primaries would take over as the chief mode of political competition when introduced later in the decade.

Roosevelt's great popularity in the state ensured his handpicked successor William Howard Taft would win Washington without difficulty, although because Bryan retained some popularity from previous campaigns in this radical state Taft could not equal Roosevelt's huge win from four years earlier.

Democratic presidential candidate William Jennings Bryan had previously won the state against William McKinley in 1896 but would later lose the state to McKinley in 1900.

Results

Results by county

See also
 United States presidential elections in Washington (state)

Notes

References

Washington (state)
1908
1908 Washington (state) elections